In dynamics, the Van der Pol oscillator is a non-conservative oscillator with non-linear damping. It evolves in time according to the second-order differential equation:where x is the position coordinate—which is a function of the time t, and μ is a scalar parameter indicating the nonlinearity and the strength of the damping.

History
The Van der Pol oscillator was originally proposed by the Dutch electrical engineer and physicist Balthasar van der Pol while he was working at Philips. Van der Pol found stable oscillations, which he subsequently called relaxation-oscillations and are now known as a type of limit cycle in electrical circuits employing vacuum tubes. When these circuits are driven near the limit cycle, they become entrained, i.e. the driving signal pulls the current along with it. Van der Pol and his colleague, van der Mark, reported in the September 1927 issue of Nature that at certain drive frequencies an irregular noise was heard, which was later found to be the result of deterministic chaos.

The Van der Pol equation has a long history of being used in both the physical and biological sciences. For instance, in biology, Fitzhugh and Nagumo extended the equation in a planar field as a model for action potentials of neurons. The equation has also been utilised in seismology to model the two plates in a geological fault, and in studies of phonation to model the right and left vocal fold oscillators.

Two-dimensional form 
Liénard's theorem can be used to prove that the system has a limit cycle. Applying the Liénard transformation , where the dot indicates the time derivative, the Van der Pol oscillator can be written in its two-dimensional form:

.
Another commonly used form based on the transformation  leads to:

.

Results for the unforced oscillator

Two interesting regimes for the characteristics of the unforced oscillator are:
 When μ = 0, i.e. there is no damping function, the equation becomes:  This is a form of the simple harmonic oscillator, and there is always conservation of energy.
 When μ > 0, the system will enter a limit cycle. Near the origin , the system is unstable, and far from the origin, the system is damped.
 The Van der Pol oscillator does not have an exact, analytic solution. However, such a solution does exist for the limit cycle if f(x) in the Lienard equation is a constant piece-wise function.

Hamiltonian for Van der Pol oscillator

One can also write a time-independent Hamiltonian formalism for the Van der Pol oscillator by augmenting it to a four-dimensional autonomous dynamical system using an auxiliary second-order nonlinear differential equation as follows:

Note that the dynamics of the original Van der Pol oscillator is not affected due to the one-way coupling between the time-evolutions of x and y variables. A Hamiltonian H for this system of equations can be shown to be

This may, in principle, lead to quantization of the Van der Pol oscillator. Such a Hamiltonian also connects the geometric phase of the limit cycle system having time dependent parameters with the Hannay angle of the corresponding Hamiltonian system.

Forced Van der Pol oscillator

The forced, or driven, Van der Pol oscillator takes the 'original' function and adds a driving function Asin(ωt) to give a differential equation of the form:

where A is the amplitude, or displacement, of the wave function and ω is its angular velocity.

Popular culture

Author James Gleick described a vacuum tube Van der Pol oscillator in his book from 1987 Chaos: Making a New Science.  According to a New York Times article, Gleick received a modern electronic Van der Pol oscillator from a reader in 1988.

See also 
 Mary Cartwright, British mathematician, one of the first to study the theory of deterministic chaos, particularly as applied to this oscillator.

 The quantum van der Pol oscillator, which is the quantum version of the classical van der Pol oscillator, has been proposed using a Lindblad equation to study its quantum dynamics and quantum synchronization. Note the above Hamiltonian approach with an auxiliary second-order equation produces unbounded phase-space trajectories and hence cannot be used to quantize the van der Pol oscillator. In the limit of weak nonlinearity (i.e. μ→0) the van der Pol oscillator reduces to the Stuart–Landau equation. The Stuart–Landau equation in fact describes an entire class of limit-cycle oscillators in the weakly-nonlinear limit. The form of the classical Stuart–Landau equation is much simpler, and perhaps not surprisingly, can be quantized by a Lindblad equation which is also simpler than the Lindblad equation for the van der Pol oscillator. The quantum Stuart–Landau model has played an important role in the study of quantum synchronisation (where it has often been called a van der Pol oscillator although it cannot be uniquely associated with the van der Pol oscillator). The relationship between the classical Stuart–Landau model (μ→0) and more general limit-cycle oscillators (arbitrary μ) has also been demonstrated numerically in the corresponding quantum models.

References

External links
 
 Van der Pol oscillator on Scholarpedia
 Van Der Pol Oscillator Interactive Demonstrations 

Chaotic maps
Dutch inventions
Ordinary differential equations
Electronic oscillators